Dillwynia acerosa is a species of flowering plant in the family Fabaceae and is endemic to Western Australia. It is an erect spindly shrub with hairy, needle-shaped leaves and yellow flowers.

Description
Flowering occurs in September and the fruit is a follicle that is not constricted between the seeds.

Taxonomy and naming
Dillwynia acerosa was first formally described in 1899 by Spencer Le Marchant Moore in Journal of the Linnean Society, Botany. The specific epithet (acerosa) means "needle-shaped", referring to the leaves.

Distribution
This goodenia grows gravelly clay in the Coolgardie, Esperance Plains, Jarrah Forest, Mallee, Murchison and Nullarbor biogeographic regions of Western Australia.

Conservation status
Dillwynia acerosa is classified as "not threatened" by the Government of Western Australia Department of Parks and Wildlife.

References

acerosa
Eudicots of Western Australia
Taxa named by Spencer Le Marchant Moore
Plants described in 1899
Mirbelioids